HMS Curacoa was a  of the Royal Navy, built by John Elder & Co., Govan, launched in 1878, and sold in 1904 to be broken up. She served on the Cape of Good Hope and West Africa Station, the Australia Station and as a training cruiser in the Atlantic.

Service history
HMS Curacoa was built by John Elder & Co., Govan, and launched on 18 April 1878.

The corvette commenced service on the Cape of Good Hope and West Africa Station before being transferred to the Australia Station arriving on 5 August 1890. She left the Australia Station in December 1894.

Curacoa was sent to the Ellice Islands and between 9 and 16 October 1892 Captain Gibson visited each of the islands to make a formal declaration that the islands were to be a British Protectorate. In June 1893 Captain Gibson visited the southern Solomon islands and made the formal declaration of the British Solomon Islands Protectorate.

Her later years were spent as a training cruiser. In February–March 1900 she visited Madeira, Las Palmas and Sao Vicente, Cape Verde.

She was sold in May 1904 to King of Garston for breaking up.

References

External links

1878 ships
Ships built on the River Clyde
Comus-class corvettes
Victorian-era corvettes of the United Kingdom